Kantipur Television, popularly known as KTV, is a private television station based in Kathmandu, Nepal. The chairman and managing director is Kailash Sirohiya. Launched in July 2002, KTV is licensed for terrestrial and satellite transmission.

Kantipur Television's head office is located in Tinkune.

KTV celebrated its 14th anniversary on 12 July 2017. The company have run the next sister channel called Kantipur Gold from February 2015. The channel Kantipur Gold, however was stopped from December 2016. During the anniversary, many journalists and best workers of the company were awarded. The network started broadcasting in HD from 14 December 2017. On 19 March 2021, Kantipur Television launched Kantipur Cineplex HD, new television station in Nepal focusing on movies broadcasting in association with Highlights Nepal, largest movie distributor and digital partner in Nepal.

Associated journalists
Dil Bhusan Pathak – Editor-in-chief
Ram Bahadur Rawal – (Former) News coordinator

News presenters

For Nepali language
Rupesh Shrestha
Bikash Thapaliya
Aneeta Shah
Prabin Siwakoti
Saroj Singh Thapa
Shraddha Aryal
Shree Pandey
Sabeena Karki
Rubina Karki

For English language
Amar Singh Pradhan 
Abhuedava Shrestha
Sarah Sapsanamma Rai
Bipashna Tamang
Sarah Chitrakar

Sports journalists
Kishan Bhandari
Roshan Bahadur Singh
Sabina Karki

List of programmes

Logos

References

External links
 
 More on Kantipur TV Online

Television channels in Nepal
2003 establishments in Nepal